The 2001 season of the Belgian Football League (BFL) is the regular season played in the Belgium. The Izeghem Redskins won Belgian Bowl XIV against the Brussels Tigers by a score of 22-0.

Regular season

Regular season standings

Post season

References

American football in Belgium
BFL
BFL